Yahan Ameena Bikti Hai is a 2016 Indian drama film directed by Kumar Raj. The Cameroon-based company MD4 Production had a small role to play in the film. Despite that, it was selected as the Cameroonian entry for the Best Foreign Language Film at the 89th Academy Awards. However, the film was not included on the final list of submissions published by the Academy.

Cast
 Rekha Rana
 Chirag Jani

See also
 List of submissions to the 89th Academy Awards for Best Foreign Language Film
 List of Cameroonian submissions for the Academy Award for Best Foreign Language Film

References

External links
 

2016 films
2016 drama films
Indian drama films
Cameroonian drama films
2010s Hindi-language films
Hindi-language drama films